The veneration of saints in the Episcopal Church is a continuation of an ancient tradition from the early Church which honors important and influential people of the Christian faith. The usage of the term saint is similar to Roman Catholic and Orthodox traditions. Episcopalians believe in the communion of saints in prayer and as such the Episcopal liturgical calendar accommodates feasts for saints.

This is the liturgical calendar found in the 1979 Book of Common Prayer, Lesser Feasts and Fasts and additions made at recent General Conventions; the relevant official resources of the Episcopal Church.

About feasts, fasts, the Anglican Communion and the liturgical calendar
The Episcopal Church publishes Lesser Feasts and Fasts, which contains feast days for the various men and women the Church wishes to honor. The 2018 version of Lesser Feasts and Fasts was formally approved at the 2022 General Convention. It and the prayer book are the only authorized calendars for the church.

There is no single calendar for the various churches making up the Anglican Communion; each makes its own calendar suitable for its local situation. As a result, the calendar here contains a number of figures important in the history of the church in the United States. Calendars in different provinces will focus on figures more important to those different countries. Different provinces often borrow important figures from each other's calendars as the international importance of different figures become more prominent. In this way the calendar of the Episcopal Church in the United States has importance beyond just the immediate purpose of supporting the liturgy of the American church. It is one of the key sources of the calendar for the international daily office Oremus.

Because of its relation to the Episcopal Church of the United States, the Episcopal Church in the Philippines follows this calendar rather closely.

Ranking of observances
The Episcopal Church's Book of Common Prayer identifies four categories of feasts: Principal Feasts, other Feasts of our Lord (including Sundays), other Major Feasts, and minor feasts. Two major fast days are also listed (Ash Wednesday and Good Friday). In addition to these categories, further distinctions are made between feasts, to determine the precedence of feasts used when more than one feast falls on the same day. In addition, Lesser Feasts and Fasts gives further rules for the relative ranking of feasts and fasts. These rules of precedence all establish a ranking, from most to least important, as follows:

 Principal Feasts
 The Feasts of the Holy Name, the Presentation, and Transfiguration
 Sundays through the year
 Ash Wednesday and Good Friday
 Feasts of our Lord
 Other Major Feasts
 Weekdays of Lent
 Minor feasts

Days of fasting and prayer
Ash Wednesday and Good Friday are appointed as major fast days with special services. "Days of special observance" or lesser fast days include all the weekdays of Lent and every Friday in the year, with the exception that fasting is never observed during the Easter or Christmas seasons, or on Feasts of our Lord. The Episcopal Church does not prescribe the specific manner of observance of these days.

Other days for prayer and optional fasting include rogation days, traditionally observed on April 25 and the three weekdays before Ascension Day, as well as the sets of Ember days four times each year.

Baptismal feasts
The Great Vigil of Easter, Pentecost, All Saints' Day, and The Baptism of our Lord, are appointed as baptismal feasts. It is preferred that baptism be reserved for those occasions.

History of the Calendar

Early Calendars
When the Episcopal Church separated from the Church of England, it created a new version of the Book of Common Prayer. It listed only 25 holy days assigned to a specific date, nearly all of them honoring New Testament persons or events. This was similar to the 16th century prayer books and in contrast to England's prayer book in use at the time of the American Revolution. That prayer book had 93 holy dates, including the feast of Charles I, martyr, and the feast of the Restoration of Charles II. It added a feast to honor Civil and Religious Liberty on July 4.

The calendar changed little in the 1892 revision of the Book of Common Prayer.

In the early 20th century, the Episcopal Church planned a revision to the book. The Commission of the Book of Common Prayer made official reports in 1916, 1919, and 1922 recommending the addition of 45 to 54 holy days. None of those were accepted, and the 1928 prayer book included none of the recommendations.

Lesser Feasts and Fasts
Starting in 1950, the Standing Liturgical Commission released sixteen Prayer Book Studies during the process of creating what eventually became the Book of Common Prayer (1979). Two of those studies proposed new sanctoral calendars for the church.

Prayer Book Study IX was published in 1957. It proposed more than 80 new feasts to the calendar, including new major feasts for the Nativity of St. John the Baptist, Saint Mary Magdalene and Holy Cross Day. 

Prayer Book Study XVI was published in 1964 as Lesser Feasts and Fasts. It was the first publication to bear that name, and also marked the first time feasts were approved for "trial use." It included more than 25 feasts that were not part of the 1957 publication. A second edition of Lesser Feasts and Fasts was published in 1973, added more than a dozen additional feasts. It was also authorized for trial use.

The first Lesser Feasts and Fasts calendar given finally approval was the 1980 edition. Its calendar was published in the Book of Common Prayer's list of optional observances.

Lesser Feasts and Fasts was revised every three years when the General Convention met. Delegates to the convention submitted names to the calendar in the form of resolutions. The convention then voted to either reject a proposed feast, refer it to the Standing Commission on Liturgy to consider, add it to the calendar on a trial basis, or give it final approval. For example, the General Convention asked the committee to consider a feast for Hildegard of Bingen in 1991. It approved her feast on a trial basis in 1994 and gave it final approval in 1997.

21st Century Trial Calendars
In 2003, the Standing Commission on Liturgy and Music began extensive work on calendar revision. It was charged with increasing the cultural diversity of the church's calendar. At the time, women made up about 7% of commemorations and most dates honored white male clergy.

In 2009, the General Convention authorized a new calendar for trial use, called Holy Women, Holy Men. The book had more than 100 additional commemorations to honor a variety of historical persons such as poet Christina Rossetti, astronomer Nicolaus Copernicus, and the Dorchester Chaplains. It increased the percentage of women represented by only 9 percentage points and was less racially diverse than past calendars.

Holy Women, Holy Men was approved with additions for three years of trial use again in 2012, with additions. It was never given final approval. 

In 2015, the commission submitted a new volume, A Great Cloud of Witnesses. It was envisioned as a replacement for Holy Women, Holy Men, and was introduced after study and collection opinion from Episcopalians online. The text of A Great Cloud of Witnesses stated that it was not intended to be a calendar of saints, but "an extended family history." The 2015 General Convention voted to make it available, but did not authorize it for trial use.

In 2018, the commission released a report saying the calendar had been thrown into a "situation of great confusion." It proposed a new calendar that updated Lesser Feasts and Fasts 2006, the last publication that had met with final authorization. It increased the percentages of women and laypersons to roughly 50%. The 2018 General Convention approved Lesser Feasts and Fasts for trial use.

2022 General Convention
The 2022 General Convention gave final authorization to the more than 90 feasts days that had been added as part of the Lesser Feasts and Fasts 2018 trial use calendar. This represented the largest number of additions to the calendar at a single general convention since 1979. The calendar in this Wikipedia article reflects those official additions.

The general convention also authorized the trial deletion of William Porcher DuBose from the calendar and authorized five feasts for trial use.

Calendar
Principal Feasts are in BOLD, ALL CAPS. Feasts of our Lord are in bold italics. Other Major Feasts and Fasts are in bold. Appropriate Collects and Prayers for use in celebrating the commemorations are in brackets.

Movable days
The following observances occur on different dates depending on the date of Easter. 
 Ash Wednesday
 Good Friday
 EASTER DAY
 ASCENSION DAY
 DAY OF PENTECOST
 The First Book of Common Prayer, 1549, observed on a weekday following Pentecost
 TRINITY SUNDAY

Thanksgiving Day is a feast on the fourth Thursday of November in the United States which may be celebrated on another day elsewhere. In addition, every Sunday in the year is observed as a "feast of our Lord".

January 
1 The Holy Name of Our Lord Jesus Christ
4 Elizabeth Ann Seton, Monastic and Educator, 1821
5 Sarah, Theodora, and Syncletica of Egypt, Desert Mothers, 4th-5th century
6 THE EPIPHANY OF OUR LORD JESUS CHRIST
8 Harriet Bedell, Deaconess and Missionary, 1969
9 Julia Chester Emery, Missionary, 1922
10 William Laud, Archbishop of Canterbury, 1645
12 Aelred, Abbot of Rievaulx, 1167
13 Hilary of Poitiers, Bishop, 367
16 Richard Meux Benson, Priest, 1915, and Charles Gore, Bishop, 1932
17 Antony of Egypt, Monastic, 356
18 The Confession of Saint Peter the Apostle
19 Wulfstan of Worcester, Bishop, 1095
20 Fabian, Bishop and Martyr of Rome, 250
21 Agnes and Cecilia of Rome, Martyrs, 304 and c.230
22 Vincent of Saragossa, Deacon and Martyr, 304
23 Phillips Brooks, Bishop, 1893
24 Florence Li Tim-Oi, Priest, 1944
25 The Conversion of Saint Paul the Apostle
26 Timothy, Titus, Companions of Saint Paul
27 John Chrysostom, Bishop and Theologian, 407
28 Thomas Aquinas, Priest and Friar, 1274
31 Marcella of Rome, Monastic and Scholar, 410

February
1 Brigid of Kildare, Monastic, 523
2 The Presentation of Our Lord Jesus Christ in the Temple
3 Anskar, Bishop and Missionary, 865
4 Manche Masemola, Martyr, 1928
4 Cornelius the Centurion
5 Agatha of Sicily, Martyr, c.251
5 The Martyrs of Japan, 1597
8 Bakhita (Josephine Margaret Bakhita), Monastic and Prophetic Witness, 1947
10 Scholastica, Monastic, 543
11 Theodora, Empress, c.867
13 Absalom Jones, Priest, 1818
14 Cyril and Methodius, Missionaries, 869, 885
15 Thomas Bray, Priest and Missionary, 1730
17 Janani Luwum, Archbishop and Martyr, 1977
18 Martin Luther, Pastor and Church Reformer 1546
19 Agnes Tsao Kou Ying, Agatha Lin Zhao, and Lucy Yi Zhenmei, Catechists and Martyrs, 1856, 1858, and 1862
20 Frederick Douglass, Prophetic Witness, 1895
22 Margaret of Cortona, Monastic, 1297
23 Polycarp of Smyrna, Bishop and Martyr of Smyrna, 156
24 Saint Matthias the Apostle
25 Emily Malbone Morgan, Prophetic Witness, 1937
26 Photini, The Samaritan Woman, c.67
27 George Herbert, priest, 1633
28 Anna Julia Haywood Cooper, Educator, 1964

March
1 David of Wales, Bishop, c. 544
2 Chad of Lichfield, Bishop, 672
3 John and Charles Wesley, Priests, 1791, 1788
7 Perpetua and Felicity, Martyrs, 203
9 Gregory of Nyssa, Bishop, c. 394
10 Harriet Ross Tubman, Social Reformer, 1913
12 Gregory the Great, Bishop and Theologian, 604
13 James Theodore Holly, Bishop of Haiti and Dominican Republic, 1911
15 Vincent de Paul, Priest, and Louise de Marillac, Monastic, Workers of Charity, 1660
17 Patrick of Ireland, Bishop and Missionary, 461
18 Cyril of Jerusalem, Bishop and Theologian, 386
19 Saint Joseph
20 Cuthbert, Bishop, 687
21 Thomas Ken, Bishop, 1711
22 James De Koven, Priest, 1879
23 Gregory the Illuminator, Bishop and Missionary of Armenia, c. 332
24 Óscar Romero, Archbishop of San Salvador, 1980, and the Martyrs of El Salvador
25 The Annunciation of Our Lord Jesus Christ to the Blessed Virgin Mary
26 Harriet Monsell, Monastic, 1883
27 Charles Henry Brent, Bishop of the Philippines, and of Western New York, 1929
28 James Solomon Russell, Priest, 1935
29 John Keble, Priest, 1866
31 John Donne, Priest and Poet, 1631

April
1 Frederick Denison Maurice, Priest, 1872
2 James Lloyd Breck, Priest, 1876
3 Richard of Chichester, Bishop of Chichester, 1253
3 Mary of Egypt, Hermit and Penitent, c.421
4 Martin Luther King Jr., Pastor, Civil Rights Leader, 1968
5 Harriet Starr Cannon, Monastic, 1896
7 Tikhon, Bishop and Ecumenist, 1925
8 William Augustus Muhlenberg, Priest, 1877 
9 Dietrich Bonhoeffer, Pastor and Theologian, 1945
10 William Law, Priest, 1761. 
11 George Augustus Selwyn, Bishop of New Zealand, and of Lichfield, 1878
14 Zenaida, Philonella, and Hermione, Unmercenary Physicians, c. 100, c.117
15 Damien, Priest and Leper, 1889, and Marianne Cope, Monastic, 1918
16 Peter Williams Cassey, Priest, 1917 and Annie Besant Cassey, 1875
17 Kateri Tekakwitha, Prophetic Witness, 1680
18 Juana Inés de la Cruz, Monastic and Theologian, 1695
19 Alphege, Archbishop of Canterbury, and Martyr, 1012
21 Anselm, Archbishop of Canterbury, 1109
22 Hadewijch of Brabant, Poet and Mystic, 13th century
23 Toyohiko Kagawa, Prophetic Witness, 1960
25 Saint Mark the Evangelist
27 Zita of Tuscany, Worker of Charity, 1271
29 Catherine of Siena, Mystic and Prophetic Witness 1380

May
1 Saint Philip and Saint James, Apostles
2 Athanasius of Alexandria, Bishop and Theologian, 373
3 Elisabeth Cruciger, Poet and Hymnographer, 1535
4 Monica of Hippo, Mother of Augustine of Hippo, 387
5 Martyrs of the Reformation Era
8 Julian of Norwich, Mystic and Theologian, c. 1417
9 Gregory of Nazianzus, Bishop of Constantinople, 389
11 Johann Arndt and Jacob Boehme, Mystics, 1621 and 1624
13 Frances Perkins, Social Reformer, 1965
15 Pachomius of Tabenissi, Monastic, 348
17 Thurgood Marshall, Public Servant, Lawyer and Jurist, 1993
19 Dunstan, Archbishop of Canterbury, 988
20 Alcuin of York, Deacon and Abbot, 804
21 Lydia of Thyatira, Coworker of the Apostle Paul
22 Helena of Constantinople, Protector of the Holy Places, 330
24 Jackson Kemper, First Missionary Bishop in the United States, 1870
25 Bede, Priest and Historian, 735
26 Augustine, First Archbishop of Canterbury, 605
28 Mechthild of Magdeburg, Mystic, c.1282
31 The Visitation of the Blessed Virgin Mary

June
1 Justin, Martyr, c. 167
2 Blandina and Her Companions, The Martyrs of Lyons, 177
3 The Martyrs of Uganda, 1886
4 Pope John XXIII (Angelo Giuseppe Roncalli), Bishop and Church Reformer, 1963
5 Boniface, Archbishop of Mainz, Missionary to Germany, and Martyr, 754
8 Melania the Elder, Monastic, 410
9 Columba of Iona, Monastic, 597
10 Ephrem of Nisibis, Deacon and Poet, 373
11 Saint Barnabas the Apostle
12 Enmegahbowh, Priest and Missionary, 1902
14 Basil of Caesarea, Bishop and Theologian, 379
15 Evelyn Underhill, Theologian and Mystic 1941
16 Joseph Butler, Bishop and Theologian, 1752
17 Marina the Monk, Monastic, 5th century
18 Bernard Mizeki, Martyr, 1896
19 Adelaide Teague Case, Educator, 1948
22 Alban, Martyr, c. 304
24 The Nativity of Saint John the Baptist
26 Isabel Florence Hapgood, Ecumenist, 1929
28 Irenaeus of Lyons, Bishop and Theologian, c. 202
29 Saint Peter and Saint Paul, Apostles

July
1 Pauli Murray, Priest, 1985
2 Moses the Black, Monastic and Martyr, c.400
4 Independence Day
6 Eva Lee Matthews, Monastic, 1928
8 Priscilla and Aquila, Coworkers of the Apostle Paul
11 Benedict of Nursia, Monastic, 543
14 Argula von Grumbach, Scholar and Church Reformer, c.1554
17 William White, Bishop, 1836
19 Macrina of Caesarea, Monastic and Teacher, 379. 
20 Elizabeth Cady Stanton, Amelia Bloomer, Sojourner Truth, and Harriet Ross Tubman, Social Reformers
21 Maria Skobtsoba, Monastic and Martyr, 1945
22 Saint Mary Magdalene
23 John Cassian, Monastic and Theologian, 435
24 Thomas a Kempis, Priest, 1471
25 Saint James the Apostle
26 The Parents of the Blessed Virgin Mary (traditionally identified as Anne and Joachim)
27 William Reed Huntington, Priest, 1909
28 Johann Sebastian Bach, Composer, 1750
29 Mary and Martha of Bethany
29 First Ordination of Women to the Priesthood in The Episcopal Church, 1974
30 William Wilberforce, Social Reformer, 1833
31 Ignatius of Loyola, Priest and Spiritual Writer, 1556

August
1 Joseph of Arimathaea
3 Joanna, Mary, and Salome, Myrrh-bearing Women
6 The Transfiguration of Our Lord Jesus Christ
7 John Mason Neale, Priest and Hymnographer, 1866. 
8 Dominic, Priest and Friar, 1221
9 Edith Stein (Teresa Benedicta of the Cross), Philosopher, Monastic, and Martyr, 1942
10 Laurence of Rome, Deacon, and Martyr, 258
11 Clare of Assisi, Monastic, 1253
12 Florence Nightingale, Nurse, Social Reformer, 1910
13 Jeremy Taylor, Bishop and Theologian, 1667
14 Jonathan Myrick Daniels, Martyr, 1965
15 Saint Mary the Virgin, Mother of Our Lord Jesus Christ
20 Bernard of Clairvaux, Monastic and Theologian, 1153
24 Saint Bartholomew the Apostle
25 Louis, King of France, 1270
26 Thomas Gallaudet and Henry Winter Syle, Priests, 1902 and 1890
28 Augustine of Hippo, Bishop and Theologian, 430 
29 The Beheading of Saint John the Baptist.
30 Margaret Ward, Margaret Clitherow, and Anne Line, Martyrs, 1588, 1586, and 1601
31 Aidan, Bishop, 651

September
1 David Pendleton Oakerhater, Deacon, 1931
2 The Martyrs of New Guinea, 1942
3 Phoebe, Deacon
4 Paul Jones, Bishop, 1941
5 Katharina Zell, Church Reformer and Writer, 1562
6 Hannah More, Religious Writer and Philanthropist, 1833
7 Kassiani, Poet and Hymnographer, 865
8 The Nativity of the Blessed Virgin Mary
9 Constance, Thecla, Ruth, Frances, Charles Parsons, and Louis Schuyler, Martyrs, 1878
10 Alexander Crummell, Priest, 1898
12 John Henry Hobart, Bishop of New York, 1830
13 John Chrysostom, Bishop of Constantinople, 407
13 Cyprian, Bishop and Martyr of Carthage, 258
14 Holy Cross Day
15 Catherine of Genoa, Mystic and Scholar, 1510
16 Ninian, Bishop, c. 430
17 Hildegard of Bingen, Mystic and Scholar, 1179
18 Edward Bouverie Pusey, Priest, 1882
19 Theodore of Tarsus, Archbishop of Canterbury, 690
20 John Coleridge Patteson, Bishop of Melanesia, and his Companions, Martyrs, 1871
21 Saint Matthew, Apostle and Evangelist
22 Philander Chase, Bishop of Ohio, and of Illinois, 1852
23 Thecla of Iconium, Proto-Martyr among Women, c.70
24 Anna Ellison Butler Alexander, Deaconess and Teacher, 1947
25 Sergius of Radonezh, Monastic, 1392
25 Euphrosyne/Smaragdus of Alexandria, Monastic, 5th century
26 Lancelot Andrewes, Bishop, 1626
28 Paula and Eustochium of Rome, Monastics and Scholars, 404 and c.419
29 Saint Michael and All Angels
30 Jerome, Priest, and Scholar, 420

October
1 Remegius, Bishop of Rheims, c. 530
1 Therese of Lisieux, Monastic, 1898]
3 George Kennedy Allen Bell, Bishop of Chichester, and Ecumenist, 1958
3 John Raleigh Mott, Ecumenist and Missionary, 1955
4 Francis of Assisi, Friar and Deacon, 1226
6 William Tyndale, Priest, 1536
7 Birgitta of Sweden, Mystic and Prophetic Witness, 1373
9 Robert Grosseteste, Bishop of Lincoln, 1253
10 Vida Dutton Scudder, Educator and Witness for Peace, 1954
11 Philip, Deacon and Evangelist
12 Edith Cavell, Nurse, 1915
14 Samuel Isaac Joseph Schereschewsky, Bishop of Shanghai, 1905
15 Teresa of Ávila, Mystic and Monastic Reformer, 1582
16 Hugh Latimer and Nicholas Ridley, Bishops and Martyrs, 1555 and Thomas Cranmer, Archbishop of Canterbury, 1556
17 Ignatius of Antioch, Bishop and Martyr, c. 115
18 Saint Luke the Evangelist
19 Henry Martyn, Priest, and Missionary, 1812.
23 Saint James of Jerusalem, Brother of our Lord Jesus Christ, and Martyr, c. 62
25 Tabitha (Dorcas) of Joppa
26 Alfred, King, 899
28 Saint Simon and Saint Jude, Apostles
29 James Hannington, Bishop of Eastern Equatorial Africa, and his Companions, Martyrs, 1885
29 Maryam of Qidun, Monastic, 4th century

November
1 ALL SAINTS
2 Commemoration of All Faithful Departed
3 Richard Hooker, Priest, 1600
6 William Temple, Archbishop of Canterbury, 1944
7 Willibrord, Archbishop of Utrecht, Missionary to Frisia, 739
8 Ammonius, Hermit, 4th century
9 Richard Rolle, Walter Hilton & Margery Kempe, Mystics, 1349, 1396, & c.1440
10 Leo of Rome, Bishop of Rome, 461
11 Martin of Tours, Bishop, 397
12 Charles Simeon, Priest, 1836
14 The Consecration of Samuel Seabury, 1784
15 Herman of Alaska, Missionary, 1837
16 Margaret of Scotland, Queen, 1093
17 Hugh of Lincoln, Bishop, 1200
18 Hilda of Whitby, Abbess, 680
19 Elizabeth of Hungary, Princess, 1231
20 Edmund, King, 870
21 Mechthilde of Hackeborn and Gertrude the Great, Mystics, 1298 and 1302
22 Clive Staples Lewis, Apologist and spiritual writer, 1963
23 Clement of Rome, Bishop, c. 100
24 Catherine of Alexandria, Barbara of Nicomedia, and Margaret of Antioch, Martyrs c.305
25 James Otis Sargent Huntington, Monastic and Priest, 1935
28 Kamehameha and Emma, King and Queen, 1864, 1885
30 Saint Andrew the Apostle

December
1 Nicholas Ferrar, Deacon, 1637
1 Charles de Foucauld, Monastic and Martyr, 1916
2 Channing Moore Williams, Missionary Bishop in China and Japan, 1910
3 Francis Xavier, Priest and Missionary, 1552
4 John of Damascus, Priest and Theologian, c. 760
5 Clement of Alexandria, Priest and Theologian, c. 210
6 Nicholas of Myra, Bishop, c. 342
7 Ambrose of Milan, Bishop and Theologian, 397
12 Francis de Sales, Bishop, and Jane de Chantal, Vowed Religious, 1622 and 1641
13 Lucy of Syracuse Martyr, 304
14 John of the Cross, Mystic and Monastic Reformer, 1591
15 Nino of Georgia, Missionary, c.332
17 Dorothy L. Sayers, Apologist and Spiritual Writer, 1957
20 Katharina von Bora, Church Reformer, 1552
21 Saint Thomas the Apostle
25 THE NATIVITY OF JESUS CHRIST
26 Saint Stephen, Deacon and Martyr
27 Saint John, Apostle and Evangelist
28 The Holy Innocents
29 Thomas Becket, Archbishop of Canterbury, 1170
31 Frances Joseph-Gaudet, Educator and Prison Reformer, 1934

Trial Use 
The 2022 General Convention authorized five feasts for trial use.
 Consecration of Bishop Barbara Clementine Harris, Feb. 11
 Harriet Tubman, Mar. 10 (moved from joint commemoration on July 20)
 Simeon Bachos, Aug. 27
 Episcopal Deaconesses, Sep. 22
 Frederick Howden, Jr., Dec. 11
It also authorized the trial deletion of William Porcher DuBose from the calendar.

See also

 Calendar of saints
 Calendar of saints (Church of England)
 General Roman Calendar

References

External links
 Calendar of the Church Year, according to the Episcopal Church
 Lesser Feasts and Fasts 2018: Conforming to General Convention 2018

Episcopal Church (United States)
United States